Luribay Municipality is the first municipal section of the Loayza Province in the  La Paz Department, Bolivia. Its seat is Luribay.

Geography 
Some of the highest mountains of the municipality are listed below:

Villages 
 

Anchallani

See also 
 Malla Jawira

References 

 www.ine.gov.bo / census 2001: Luribay Municipality
http://luribay-loayza.blogspot.com.br/

External links 
 Map of the Loayza Province

Municipalities of La Paz Department (Bolivia)